Theodore Lyman may refer to:

 Theodore B. Lyman (1815–1893), American bishop
 Theodore Lyman II (1792–1849), American philanthropist, politician, and author
 Theodore Lyman III (1833–1897), American natural scientist, military staff officer, and politician
 Theodore Lyman IV (1874–1954), American physicist